WENG (1530 kHz) is a commercial AM radio station broadcasting a talk radio format. Licensed to Englewood, Florida, the studios are on South River Road.  WENG serves the Florida Sun Coast between Sarasota and Fort Myers.  It is owned by Joe Fiorini, through Fiorini Broadcasting, LLC.  

By day, WENG is powered at 1,000 watts non-directional.  But 1530 AM is a clear channel frequency reserved for Class A WCKY Cincinnati.  So at night, to reduce interference, WENG greatly reduces power to just one watt.  Programming is heard around the clock on two FM translators at 98.1 MHz and 107.5 MHz.

Programming 
Weekday mornings on WENG begin with "The Sun Coast This Morning with Ken Birdsong," a local news and information show.  The rest of the weekday schedule is nationally syndicated conservative talk shows, including Glenn Beck, Jimmy Failla, Sean Hannity, Mark Levin, Jim Bohannon, "America in the Morning," "This Morning, America's First News with Gordon Deal" and "Coast to Coast AM with George Noory."  

Weekends feature Kim Komando, Leo Laporte, "Somewhere in Time with Art Bell" and "Live from The 60s with The Real Don Steele."  Most hours begin with an update from Fox News Radio.

History
It was owned and operated by the Sarasota-Charlotte Broadcasting Corporation. Edward J. Ewing Jr. was the first general manager. At that time, the station was a daytimer, required to go off the air at night.

On August 27, 1993, the station was acquired by The Murray Broadcasting Company.  Murray renovated the studios and offices and installed state-of-the-art equipment and digital sound technology.  

WENG was later acquired by Joe Fiorini and operated by Fiorini Broadcasting LLC.

Translators 
WENG broadcasts on two FM translators.

References

External links 

Radio stations established in 1964
ENG
1964 establishments in Florida